Mohammed Eyadah Alkobaisi 
() is an Islamic scholar with PhD in specialized Islamic studies.

Academic Study 
He holds a PhD from Baghdad University, 2002, in specialized Islamic studies. The thesis was titled: 'The Lost Part of Tafseer Ibn Abi Hatim Ar-Razi'. He holds 'Ejazaah' scholarly degree, in the six books of hadith, with continuous-chain to Mohammed. He holds many 'Ejaazah' scholarly degrees, from different scholars in different linguistic and Islamic Sciences.

Work  
Alkobaisi is a Grand Mufti at Islamic Affairs and Charitable Activities Department in Dubai.

Activities 
Alkobaisi is a public figure and a TV personality, and he is the writer and presenter of Understanding Islam TV Show, a weekly educational program about Islam and its different aspects that shape and affect the life of Muslims. The show targets English speaking Muslims, new Muslims and people interested in knowing more about the religion of Islam. 
Understanding Islam TV Show concentrates on the practical application of the Islamic guidance, and its importance in the real daily life of people.

Achievements

Academic publications 

Recently, many academic works of Alkobaisi have been printed, including:

 Sawm Al-Qoloob,. 
 Selected Fatwas on AL-HAJJ,. 
 Selected Fatwas on AL-Taharah,. 
 Selected Fatwas on AL-Salah,. 
 Selected Fatwas on AL-Salah 2,. 
 Selected Fatwas on AL-Salah 3,. 
 Tafseer Sorat Al-Qasas, an objective interpretation,. 
 Tafseer Sorat Aal-Imraan, an objective interpretation,.
 Selected Fatwas on AL-Uthhiya 1,. 
 Selected Fatwas on AL-Uthhiya 2,. 
 Selected Fatwas on Zakat Al Fitr 1,. 
 Selected Fatwas on Zakat Al Fitr 2,.
 Many peer reviewed research papers.

TV Programs 

 Adh-Dharibon fi Al-Ard, Arabic, 194 episodes, Dubai Business Channel. 
 Shari'ah and Real-estate, English, 8 episodes, Al-Aqaria Channel. 
 Fa Innaho Yarak, Arabic, 20 episodes, Al-Aqaria Channel. 
 Nafahat Ramadaniya 1, Arabic, 30 episodes. 
 Nafahat Ramadaniya 2, Arabic, 30 episodes. 
 Understanding Islam 1, English, 18 episodes, Dubai One TV. 
 Understanding Islam 2, English, 39 episodes, Dubai One TV. 
 Understanding Islam 3, English, 36 episodes, Dubai One TV. 
 Understanding Islam 4, English, on going, Dubai One TV. 
 Understanding Islam Ramadan 1, English, 29 episodes, Dubai One TV. 
 Understanding Islam Ramadan 2, English, 30 episodes, Dubai One TV. 
 Understanding Islam Ramadan 3, English, 30 episodes, Dubai One TV.

Awards 

 Award of distinction in the Research House for Islamic Studies and Heritage Revival, Government of Dubai, in 2006.
 First place award as the "Distinguished Researcher" in the Islamic Affairs and Charitable Activities Department IACAD's Excellence Award in 2007.
 First place award as the "Distinguished Mufti" in the Islamic Affairs and Charitable Activities Department IACAD's Excellence Award in 2008.
Dubai Government Excellence Program Award recognizes and rewards exceptional government employees and departments.
 First place award as the "Distinguished Mufti" in the Islamic Affairs and Charitable Activities Department IACAD's Excellence Award in 2011.

References 

Living people
Iraqi people of Arab descent
Iraqi television personalities
20th-century imams
Iraqi Islamic religious leaders
21st-century Muslim scholars of Islam
Sunni Muslim scholars of Islam
Sunni imams
1970 births